USS Gear (ARS-34) was a Diver-class rescue and salvage ship acquired by the U.S. Navy during World War II. Her task was to come to the aid of stricken vessels.

Gear (BARS-4), originally intended for the Royal Navy under terms of the Lend-Lease Program, was launched as HMS Pacific Salvor (BARS-4) on 24 October 1942 by the Basalt Rock Company in Napa, California; acquired by the U.S. Navy and designated Gear (ARS-34) on 21 September 1942; and commissioned 24 September 1943.

World War II service 
 
Gear departed San Diego, California, on 6 December 1943 en route via Pearl Harbor and the Gilbert Islands to Eniwetok atoll in, the Marshall Islands. Here she performed salvage, towing, and repair for ships of the fleet as a unit of Service Squadron 10 until 17 July 1944.

Support operations at Saipan and Tinian 

She provided similar services at Saipan (25 July – 7 August), shifting to Apra Harbor, Guam, on 8 August 1944 for various operations that included the towing and sinking of concrete barges on Calalan Bank to serve as a breakwater; pulling amphibious landing ships off various beaches: and towing a ship to Tinian and Saipan before return. She returned to Pearl Harbor from the Marianas on 6 December 1944 for overhaul, and departed on 29 January 1945 with an amphibious assault force bound for Iwo Jima.

Iwo Jima operations 
 
Gear arrived in the outer transport area of Iwo Jima on 19 February 1945 to witness the landing of U.S. Marines under cover of intensive Naval gunfire and air attack. She proved invaluable in assisting the ships of the fleet, pumping out flooded spaces, repairing mortars, making ship repairs and performing various towing assignments. She returned to Saipan on 5 March with an LSM and two LCI's in tow.

Okinawa operations 

Four days later she was en route with a transport assault force that arrived off Okinawa on 1 April, D-day of invasion. She departed Okinawa on 15 May for repair service at Ulithi (21 May – 12 June), then proceeded via Eniwetok with two tank landing ships in tow for Pearl Harbor, arriving 6 July 1945.

Alaskan Sea Frontier service 
 
Gear departed Pearl Harbor on 11 July and arrived at Portland, Oregon on the 20th. After voyage repairs, she performed towing and salvage for the Alaskan Sea Frontier at Adak, Alaska, until 6 May 1946, returning to San Pedro, California, on the 23d for services there until decommissioned on 13 December 1946.

Reactivation with a civilian crew 
 
Gear was assigned to the San Diego Group, U.S. Pacific Reserve Fleet until 24 February 1953. A civilian crew of the Merritt Chapman Scott Corp. then operated her for Navy towing and salvage service at San Pedro, California. Under contract to the Merritt Chapman Scott Corp., she continued Navy salvage and repair duties at San Pedro with occasional coast towing.

Final disposition 

Gear was returned to U.S. Navy custody (date unknown) and struck from the Naval Register, 30 April 1981. Final Disposition: she was sold for scrapping, 1 July 1982, by the Defense Reutilization and Marketing Service.

Military awards and honors 

Gear won several battle stars during World War II:
 Iwo Jima operation
 Okinawa Gunto operation
Her crew was eligible for the following medals:
 American Campaign Medal
 Asiatic-Pacific Campaign Medal (2)
 World War II Victory Medal

References

External links 
 
 Basalt Rock Company at Shipbuilding History

 

Diver-class rescue and salvage ships
Ships built in Napa, California
World War II auxiliary ships of the United States
1942 ships